Robert Frederick Tayler (17 March 1836 – 1 January 1888) was an English amateur cricketer who played between 1860 and 1872.

Tayler was born at Hastings in Sussex in 1836. He is first known to have played cricket for the amateur Gentlemen of Hampshire side in 1860 before making his first-class cricket debut for the Gentlemen of Kent against the Gentlemen of the MCC in August 1865. He played in a total five first-class matches, including two for Kent County Cricket Club later in 1865 and two for Hampshire County Cricket Club in 1866.

Tayler died at Woking in Surrey on 1 January 1888 aged 51.

References

External links

1836 births
1888 deaths
Sportspeople from Hastings
English cricketers
Kent cricketers
Hampshire cricketers
Gentlemen of Kent cricketers